Israel–Peru relations are foreign relations between Israel and Peru.  Both countries established diplomatic relations in 1957.  Israel has an embassy in Lima.  Peru has an embassy in Tel Aviv.

History
In 1998, Israel and Peru agreed to talks on establishing free trade between the two countries.

During the devastating earthquakes that have hit Peru (1970, 2005, 2007), Israel was the first country to send help. Israel sent the distinguished Israel Defense Forces Unit 669 Search and Rescue unit, along with members of the IDF medical corp which set up a field hospital.

In 2001, Eliane Karp, a former Israeli, became First Lady of Peru.

In 2011, former chief of staff of the Peruvian Armed Forces, General Francisco Contreras said, “We definitely need to be concerned with the growing presence of Iran in South America. It appears that Iranian organizations provide support to other terrorist organizations, and that there is cooperation between them. There is something strange in the relationship Chavez has forged with Iran, as is the presence of the Iranian defense minister in Bolivia on a recent visit.” According to Contreras, countries like Israel and Peru need to increase cooperation to combat the growing terrorist threat.

Trade and military cooperation
Bilateral trade was $37 million in 1997.  $31 million coming from Israeli exports to Peru. Israeli exports to Peru rose 71.5% in the first quarter of 1998 compared with the same period in the previous year. Israeli exports consisted of machinery and plastics. Israel imports food, beverages and tobacco from Peru. 

Israel's defense ties with Peru go back several decades, and in recent years include the sale of Rafael's Spike anti-tank missile to the Peruvian army, as well as Israeli drones to its air force. In 2009, the government of Peru signed a $9 million deal with Global CST, a defense-consulting firm based in Petah Tikva, run by former IDF general Yisrael Ziv. Peruvian General Contreras said he decided to hire Ziv's company to help train the military how to combat terrorists from the Sendero Luminoso (Shining Path) Maoist organization.

According to Contreras, Ziv's company focused on training elite forces for special counterterror operations, strengthening Peruvian intelligence networks, and assisting security forces in working together to kill or capture Sendero Luminoso members. Contreras said that despite pressure from the US not to hire a private company, the combination of assistance from the US Military and Ziv's company turned the tide in Peru's war on terror, and that "The combination brought a major change, and our military became more offensive and took the battle to the terrorists, instead of always being on the defensive."

In May 2013, Peru's Minister of Agriculture, Milton von Hesse, held talks with his Israeli counterpart Yair Shamir to strengthen cooperation in agriculture and implement projects. Von Hesse said that Israel has developed a modern agricultural technology to address the problems caused by deserts, and Peru is eager to learn from their experience, and therefore achieve efficient water management in arid areas.

See also
 Foreign relations of Israel
 Foreign relations of Peru
 List of ambassadors of Peru to Israel
 List of ambassadors of Israel to Peru
 International recognition of Israel
 History of the Jews in Latin America
 B'nai Moshe

References

 
Peru 
Bilateral relations of Peru